The Catholic Institute of Sydney, a tertiary educational facility that is a member institution of the Sydney College of Divinity, delivers theological studies at both undergraduate and postgraduate qualifications.

In 1996 the Institute superseded St Patrick's College,  and St Columba's College,  (itself earlier superseded in 1977) as the sole ecclesiastical theology faculty for the Catholic Church in New South Wales.

See also

Roman Catholic Church in Australia
St Patrick's College, Manly

References

Seminaries and theological colleges in New South Wales
Buildings and structures of the Catholic Church in Australia